The 2002 Barrow-in-Furness Legionnaires' disease outbreak was a fatal outbreak of Legionellosis which occurred in Barrow-in-Furness, Cumbria, England. It was and still remains among the worst such outbreaks in history.

The first fatality occurred on 2 August 2002. The source of the bacteria was later found to be from steam coming out of a badly maintained air conditioning unit. The system was located in the council-run arts centre Forum 28, with the vent emitting the disease over a busy alleyway in the town centre. Ultimately seven people died and 172 cases were reported (a case fatality rate of around 4%), ranking as the second worst in British history and seventh worst globally by death count.

The coroner for Furness and South Cumbria criticised the council for its failings with regard to health and safety at the conclusion of an inquest into the seven deaths. In 2006, council employee Gillian Beckingham and employer Barrow Borough Council were cleared of seven charges of manslaughter. Beckingham, the council senior architect, was fined £15,000 and the authority £125,000. The authority maintained that Beckingham was not responsible for the building or the defective plant and dismissed the building Technical Manager Kevin Borthwick. He was later re-instated to his position following a challenge by his union. The borough council was the first public body in the country to have faced corporate manslaughter charges. Beckingham maintained that a contract to maintain the plant was in place but failings of others meant that the work was never undertaken, nor was the lack of adequate maintenance pursued by those responsible for the building. Following the trials, the contractor responsible for maintaining the defective plant, Interserve, settled a £1.5 million claim by the Council for damages.

See also

 List of Legionellosis outbreaks
 List of disasters of the United Kingdom and preceding states
 2002 in the United Kingdom

References

2002 disasters in the United Kingdom
2002 disease outbreaks
2002 in England
2000s in Cumbria
2002 Legionnaires' disease outbreak
Disasters in Cumbria
Legionellosis
Disease outbreaks in England